Krishna Kumar Goyal (1932/1933 – 21 April 2013) was an Indian politician from Kota, Rajasthan and a leader of the Bharatiya Janata Party.

In 1962 he was elected to the Rajasthan Assembly from Kota Constituency as a Bharatiya Jana Sangh Candidate. Again, in 1967, he was re-elected to the Rajasthan Assembly from Kota Constituency as a Bharatiya Jana Sangh Candidate. During the emergency period, he was in Jail for a period of 19 months. In 1977 he was elected to the 6th Lok Sabha from Kota constituency in Rajasthan state as a Janata Party candidate. He was the minister of Commerce, Civil Supplies, and Cooperation in the union cabinet headed by Morarji Desai from 1977 to 1980. Again, in 1980, he was elected to the 7th Lok Sabha from Kota (Rajasthan) and was a member of the various Committees in the parliament during 1980-1984. In 1989, he was elected to the Rajasthan Assembly from Bundi Constituency. During 1989 - 1992, he served as Industry Minister in Rajasthan Government headed by Bhairon Singh Shekhawat. From, 1993 - 1995, he was the Chairman of the Finance Commission of Rajasthan.

At the age of 80 years, he died on 21 April 2013.

References

Rajasthani politicians
Bharatiya Janata Party politicians from Rajasthan
People from Kota, Rajasthan
India MPs 1977–1979
India MPs 1980–1984
Lok Sabha members from Rajasthan
1930s births
2013 deaths
Rajasthan MLAs 1990–1992
Rajasthan MLAs 1962–1967
State cabinet ministers of Rajasthan
Janata Party politicians
Bharatiya Jana Sangh politicians